shortened to Hantenren is a Japanese ultra-left group opposed to the Emperor of Japan, Flag of Japan, Kimigayo and Yasukuni Shrine.

History
After the birth of Princess Aiko, the first born of the Crown Prince and Princess in December 2001, 60 Hantenren members conducted a protest against nationwide celebrations of the birth. One member Homare Kitano, 42, is quoted saying “Today, many other children were born, but this baby will be praised as if she is the most blessed child”. Other protesters chanted slogans such as “We won’t celebrate” and “No need for successor to Imperial family,” while wearing sashes with an “X” written over the kanji for celebration.

During the 2019 Japanese imperial transition, a small crowd on Hantenren supporters protested the ascension of Naruhito with little attention given.

See also
 Aki no Arashi
 Anti-monarchism in Japan

References

External links

1984 establishments in Japan
Anti-imperialist organizations
Anti-nationalism
Communism in Japan
Far-left politics in Japan
Organizations established in 1984
Political organizations based in Japan
Republicanism in Japan